Nemeshetés is a village in Zala County, Hungary.

References

External links
 Official website

Populated places in Zala County